The state trunkline highways in Marquette County, Michigan, account for about  of the State Trunkline Highway System in Michigan. Most roads within the county are two-lane highways, while others are sections of four-lane highways or city streets. There are no interstate highways in Marquette County. There is one U.S. Highway that runs through the county, U.S. Highway 41 (US 41), and six other signed trunklines. A state-maintained business loop in the county is included in the total. There are two former trunklines, one of which was a business loop.

Roadways 

The roadways in Marquette County fall into one of three general classifications: state trunklines, county roads or city streets. The Michigan Department of Transportation (MDOT) maintains two categories of trunklines that run through the county: US highways and regular state trunklines. There have been 13 state trunkline highway designations used in Marquette County, six of which have been transferred to the jurisdiction of a city or redesignated with another number. Trunklines that are not Interstate or US highways bear a M-route designation with the diamond marker.

State trunkline highways

U.S. Highways 

There has been one U.S. Highway in Marquette County, U.S. Highway 41 (US 41), which spans for over  within the county. The highway was numbered by 1919 as M-15; however, this designation was changed in 1926. Since its designation, US 41 has served the cities of Marquette, Negaunee, and Ishpeming. US 41 has had two business loops in the county, although neither of them still exist as Bus. US 41. Bus. US 41 in Marquette was transferred to the City of Marquette in 2005, and Bus. US 41 in Ishpeming and Negaunee is now just Bus. M-28. US 41/M-28 runs concurrently through the county, forming a major artery for Michigan and even Canadian traffic.

Other state trunklines 

Of the 13 trunkline designations used in Marquette County, 10 of them have been used for regular state trunklines. Four of these designations are no longer in use. M-15 is now US 41, and M-45 is now M-95. M-554 has been transferred to the City of Marquette and was reclassified as a city street. The Bus. M-28 designation on the former Bus. US 41 was retired in the late 1970s. Other trunklines in the county include M-35 and the M-route trunkline that bears the highest number in the state, M-553.

County-maintained roads 

All public roadways in Michigan that are not state trunklines or city streets are maintained by the county road commission, including streets in communities that are a part of a township. Marquette County signs primary county roads with a marker bearing a three-digit number. Other roads are assigned double- or triple-letter designations in addition to any names assigned to the roadways by a city or township.

City streets 
The remaining category of public roadway in Marquette County is that of city streets. The streets are maintained by one of the three cities in the county: Ishpeming, Negaunee, or Marquette. The cities are responsible for maintaining any streets that are not otherwise under the control of state or county. Lakeshore Drive in Ishpeming was transferred to state control in 1999 to become part of Bus. M-28, and Grove Street in Marquette is also CR 500. These two streets, like others in the county, are under the jurisdiction of the state or county.

Statistics 
The chart below shows the state trunkline highways in Marquette County by year of creation, municipalities crossed, and length within the county.

Notes

References 

Marquette County
Transportation in Marquette County, Michigan